Martin Smeby (8 September 1891 – 1 February 1975) was a Norwegian politician for the Labour Party.

He was born in Søndre Land.

He was elected to the Norwegian Parliament from Oppland in 1936, and was re-elected on four occasions. He had previously served in the position of deputy representative during the term 1928–1930.

Smeby became a member of Søndre Land municipality council in 1919. He soon became deputy mayor, a position he held in 1922–1925 and 1937–1939. He served as mayor in 1928–1931, 1931–1933, 1940 and 1945.

References

1891 births
1975 deaths
People from Søndre Land
Labour Party (Norway) politicians
Members of the Storting
20th-century Norwegian politicians